Stanley John Bailey (1901–1980) was Rouse Ball Professor of English Law in the University of Cambridge from 1950 to 1968. He was author of The Law of Wills (Pitman's Equity Series: 1st Ed, 1935; 2nd Ed, 1940; 3rd Ed, 1948; 4th Ed, 1953; 5th Ed, 1957; 6th Ed, 1967; 7th Ed, 1973), an "introductory survey" which was "well known" and "extremely readable". He was editor of the Cambridge Law Journal from 1948 to 1954. He wrote articles for that journal and for the Law Quarterly Review.

References
The British Studies Monitor, Anglo-American Associates, 1980, Volume 10, Issue 3, p 90. Google Books
Wright, C A (1937) 2 University of Toronto Law Journal 189 JSTOR
B L (1942) 4 University of Toronto Law Journal 457 JSTOR
Mitchell, J B D (1954) 17 Modern Law Review 491 JSTOR
Mitchell, J B D (1959) 22 Modern Law Review 349 JSTOR
R H K (1936) 6 Cambridge Law Journal 130 JSTOR
T E L (1941) 7 Cambridge Law Journal 436 JSTOR
Scott, Kenneth. "Book Reviews" (1958) 16 Cambridge Law Journal 115 JSTOR
(1948) 207 Law Times and Journal of Property 188 Google Books
(1941) 75 Irish Law Times and Solicitors' Journal 34 Google Books
(1967) 111 Solicitors Journal 886 Google Books
Books of the Month. Simpkins Publishing Company. 1953. Page 30. Google Books
Bar Bulletin of the New York County Lawyers' Association, 1957, Volumes 15-16, p 155 Google Books
(1935) 179 The Law Times 275 Google Books
(1935) 1 The Irish Jurist, Together with the Irish Jurist Reports 56 Google Books
Marke, J J. A Catalogue of the Law Collection at New York University. New York University Law Library. 1953. p 499.
Ringrose, CW. Where to Look for Your Law. 10th Ed. Sweet & Maxwell. 1948. p 118. Google Books
Law Books in Print. Glanville Publishers. 1976. pp 139 & 475. Google Books

1901 births
1980 deaths
Rouse Ball Professors of English Law